Because of Germany's long history before 1871 as a non-united region of distinct tribes and states, there are many widely varying names of Germany in different languages, more so than for any other European nation.

List of area names 
In general, the names for Germany can be arranged in six main groups according to their origin:

1. From Old High German diutisc or similar

Afrikaans: Duitsland
Danish: Tyskland
Dutch: Duitsland
Faroese: Týskland
German: Deutschland
Icelandic: Þýskaland
Japanese:  (Doitsu)
Kinyarwanda: Ubudage
Lojban: dotygu'e
Low German/Low Saxon: Düütschland/Duutslaand
Luxembourgish: Däitschland
Medieval Latin: Teutonia, regnum Teutonicum
Nahuatl: Teutōtitlan
Norwegian: Tyskland
Northern Sami: Duiska
Northern Sotho: Tôitšhi
Swedish: Tyskland
Vietnamese: 
West Frisian: Dútslân
Yiddish:  (daytshland)

2. From the Latin Germania

Acehnese: Jeureuman
Albanian: Gjermania
Aramaic: ܓܪܡܢ (jerman)
Armenian:  (Germania)
Bengali: জার্মানি (jarmani)
Bulgarian: Германия (Germánija)
Burmese:  (gyamani)
Modern English: Germany
Esperanto: Germanio (also Germanujo)
Friulian: Gjermanie
Georgian:  (germania)
Greek:  (Germanía)
Gujarati:  (jarmanī)
Hausa: Jamus
Modern Hebrew:  (germánya)
Hindustani: जर्मनी / جرمنی (jarmanī)
Ido: Germania
Pashto:جارمنی/jarmani
Indonesian: JermanInterlingua: GermaniaIrish: An GhearmáinItalian: GermaniaHawaiian: KelemaniaKannada: ಜರ್ಮನಿ (jarmani)
Lao: ເຢຍລະມັນ (yīa la man)
Latin: GermaniaMacedonian: 
Malay (incl. Malaysian and Indonesian): JermanManx: Yn GhermaanMaltese: ĠermanjaMāori: TiamanaMarathi: जर्मनी (jarmanī)
Marshallese: 
Mongolian:  (German)
Nauruan: DjermaniNepali: जर्मनी (jarmanī)
Panjabi: ਜਰਮਨੀ (jarmanī)
Romanian: GermaniaRumantsch: GermaniaRussian:  (Germánija)
Samoan: SiamaniSardinian: GermaniaScottish Gaelic: A' GhearmailtSicilian: GirmaniaSinhala: ජර්මනිය (jarmaniya)
Sundanese: JermanSwahili: UjerumaniTahitian: Heremani 
Tamil: இடாய்ச்சுலாந்து (idaichulandu), செருமனி (cerumani), ஜெர்மனி (jermani)
Thai: เยอรมนี (yəə-rá-má-nii), เยอรมัน (yəə-rá-man) (adjective)
Tongan: SiamaneUrdu:  (jarmanī)

3. From the name of the Alamanni tribe

Arabic:  ('''ʾalmānyā)
Asturian: Alemaña
Azerbaijani: Almaniya
Basque: Alemania
Breton: Alamagn
Catalan: Alemanya
Cornish: Almayn
Filipino: Alemanya
Franco-Provençal: Alemagnes
French: Allemagne
Galician: Alemaña
Kazakh:  (Almanïya), not used anymore or used very rarely, now using Russian "Германия".
Khmer:  (ʾaalləɨmɑng)
Kurdish: Elmaniya
Latin: Alemannia
Mirandese: Almanha
Occitan: Alemanha
Ojibwe ᐋᓂᒫ (aanimaa)
Persian:  (ālmān)
Piedmontese: AlmagnaPortuguese: AlemanhaQuechua: AlimanyaSpanish: AlemaniaTajik:  (Olmon)
Tatar:  AlmaniaTetum: AlemañaTurkish: AlmanyaWelsh: Yr Almaen (with preceding definite article)

4. From the name of the Saxon tribe

Finnish: SaksaLivonian: SaksāmōRomani: Ssassitko temmVeps: SaksanmaVõro: S'aksamaa5. From the Protoslavic němьcь

Belarusian:  (Njamjéččyna)
Bosnian: NjemačkaBulgarian:  (Nemsko) (obsolete colloquial)
Croatian: NjemačkaCzech: NěmeckoHungarian: NémetországKashubian: MiemieckôMontenegrin: NjemačkaOttoman Turkish:  (nemçe), meaning all Austrian – Holy Roman Empire countries
Polish: NiemcySerbian:  (Nemačka)
Silesian: ŃymcySlovak: NemeckoSlovene: 
Lower Sorbian: NimskaUpper Sorbian: NěmskaUkrainian:  (Niméččyna)

6. From the name of Prussia*: Teutonisch Land, Teutschland used in many areas until the 19th century (see Walhalla opening song)

Limburgish: Pruses (mostly in derogatory meaning)
informal Luxembourgish: Preiseninformal Twents: De PruusSilesian: PrusacyTahitian: Purutia (also Heremani, see above) 

7. Unclear origin

Kursenieki: Vāce ZėmLatgalian: VuocejaLatvian: VācijaLithuanian: VokietijaSamogitian: VuokītėjėOther forms:
Medieval Greek: Frángoi, frangikós (for Germans, German) – after the Franks.
Medieval Hebrew:  (Ashkenaz) – from biblical Ashkenaz was the son of Japheth and grandson of Noah. Ashkenaz is thought to be the ancestor of the Germans.
Lower Sorbian: bawory or bawery (in older or dialectal use) – from the name of Bavaria. 
Silesian: szwaby from Swabia, bambry used for German colonists from the area around Bamberg, krzyżacy (a derogative form of krzyżowcy – crusaders) referring to Teutonic Order, Rajch or Rajś resembling German pronunciation of Reich. 
Old Norse: Suðrvegr – literally south way (cf. Norway), describing Germanic tribes which invaded continental Europe. 
Kinyarwanda: Ubudage, Kirundi: Ubudagi – thought to derive from the greeting guten Tag used by Germans during the colonial times, or from deutsch.
Navajo:  ("Metal Cap-wearer Land"), in reference to Stahlhelm-wearing German soldiers.
Lakota:  ("Bad Speaker Land").
Plains Cree: pîwâpiskwastotininâhk ("Among the Steel Helmets")	or mâyakwêsinâhk ("Among the Speakers of a Foreign/Strange Language")
Sudovian: miksiskai, Old Prussian miksiskāi (both for "German") – from miksît "to stammer".
Polish (slang of the communist period): Erefen from R.F.N. = F.R.G. (Federal Republic of Germany),
Polish (pre-Second World War slang): Rajch from German ReichNames from Diutisc

The name Deutschland and the other similar-sounding names above are derived from the Old High German diutisc, or similar variants from Proto-Germanic *Þeudiskaz (Old English þeod), which originally meant "of the people". This in turn comes from a Germanic word meaning "folk" (leading to Old High German diot, Middle High German diet), and was used to differentiate between the speakers of Germanic languages and those who spoke Celtic or Romance languages. These words come from *teuta, the Proto-Indo-European word for "people" (Lithuanian and Latvian tauta, Old Irish tuath).

Also the Italian for "German", tedesco (local or archaic variants: todesco, tudesco, todisco), comes from the same Old High German root, although not the name for "Germany" (Germania). Also in the standardised Romansh language Germania is the normal name for Germany but in Sursilvan, Sutsilvan and Surmiran it is commonly referred to as Tiaratudestga, Tearatudestga and Tera tudestga respectively, with tiara/teara/tera meaning land. French words thiois, tudesque, théotisque and Thiogne and Spanish tudesco share this etymology.

The Germanic language which diutisc most likely comes from is West Frankish, a language which died out a long time ago and which there is hardly any written evidence for today. This was the Germanic dialect used in the early Middle Ages, spoken by the Franks in Western Francia, i.e. in the region which is now northern France. The word is only known from the Latin form theodiscus. Until the 8th century the Franks called their language frengisk; however, when the Franks moved their political and cultural centre to the area where France now is, the term frengisk became ambiguous, as in the West Francian territory some Franks spoke Latin, some vulgar Latin and some theodisc. For this reason a new word was needed to help differentiate between them. Thus the word theodisc evolved from the Germanic word theoda (the people) with the Latin suffix -iscus, to mean "belonging to the people", i.e. the people's language.

In Eastern Francia, roughly the area where Germany now is, it seems that the new word was taken on by the people only slowly, over the centuries: in central Eastern Francia the word frengisk was used for a lot longer, as there was no need for people to distinguish themselves from the distant Franks. The word diutsch and other variants were only used by people to describe themselves, at first as an alternative term, from about the 10th century. It was used, for example, in the Sachsenspiegel, a legal code, written in Middle Low German in about 1220:  Iewelk düdesch lant hevet sinen palenzgreven: sassen, beieren, vranken unde svaven(Every German land has its Graf: Saxony, Bavaria, Franken and Swabia). In the Carion's Chronicle, the German reformator Philip Melanchthon argued the Germans were descendants of the in the biblical Ashkenaz, the son of Japheth. They shall have called themselves the Ascenos, which with time derived into Tuiscones.

The Teutoni, a tribe with a name which probably came from the same root, did, through Latin, ultimately give birth to the English words "Teuton" (first found in 1530) for the adjective German, (as in the Teutonic Knights, a military religious order, and the Teutonic Cross) and "Teuton" (noun), attested from 1833. "Teuton" was also used for Teutonisch Land (land of the Teutons), its abbreviation Teutschland used in some areas until the 19th century and its currently used official variation Deutschland.

In the northern French language area (northern France, Belgium), the neighboring Germanic dialects, areas and inhabitants of Flanders to Alsace are sometimes referred to as Thiois, most likely still for the area between Maastricht and Aachen and for the traditional German speaking part of Lorraine (Lorraine Thioise), The term is obsolete and derives from theodisc (see above).

Names from Germania

The name Germany and the other similar-sounding names above are all derived from the Latin Germania, of the 3rd century BC, a word simply describing fertile land behind the limes (frontier). It was likely the Gauls who first called the people who crossed east of the Rhine Germani (which the Romans adopted) as the original Germanic tribes did not refer to themselves as Germanus (singular) or Germani (plural).

Julius Caesar was the first to use Germanus in writing when describing tribes in north-eastern Gaul in his Commentarii de Bello Gallico: he records that four northern Belgic tribes, namely the Condrusi, Eburones, Caeraesi and Paemani, were collectively known as Germani. In AD 98, Tacitus wrote Germania (the Latin title was actually: De Origine et situ Germanorum), an ethnographic work on the diverse set of Germanic tribes outside the Roman Empire. Unlike Caesar, Tacitus claims that the name Germani was first applied to the Tungri tribe. The name Tungri is thought to be the endonym corresponding to the exonym Eburones.

19th-century and early 20th-century historians speculated on whether the northern Belgae were Celts or Germanic tribes. Caesar claims that most of the northern Belgae were descended from tribes who had long ago crossed the Rhine from Germania. However many tribal names and personal names or titles recorded are identifiably Celtic. It seems likely that the northern Belgae, due to their intense contact with the Gaulish south, were largely influenced by this southern culture. Tribal names were 'qualifications' and could have been translated or given by the Gauls and picked up by Caesar. Perhaps they were Germanic people who had adopted Gaulish titles or names. The Belgians were a political alliance of southern Celtic and northern Germanic tribes. In any case, the Romans were not precise in their ethnography of northern barbarians: by "German(ic)" Caesar meant "originating east of the Rhine". Tacitus wrote in his book Germania: "The Treveri and Nervii take pride in their German origin, stating that this noble blood separates them from all comparison (with the Gauls) and the Gaulish laziness".

The OED2 records theories about the Celtic roots of the Latin word Germania: one is gair, neighbour (a theory of Johann Zeuss, a German historian and Celtic philologist) – in Old Irish gair is "neighbour". Another theory is gairm, battle-cry (put forward by Johann Wachter and Jacob Grimm, who was a philologist as well as collector and editor of fairy tales). Yet another theory is that the word comes from ger, "spear"; however, Eric Partridge suggests *gar / gavin, to shout (as Old Irish garim), describing the Germanic tribesmen as noisy. He describes the ger theory as "obsolete".

In English, the word "German" is first attested in 1520, replacing earlier uses of Almain, Alman and Dutch. In German, the word Germanen today refers to Germanic tribes, just like the Italian noun "Germani" (adjective: "germanici"), and the French adjective "germanique". The English noun "german" (as in "cousin-german") and the adjective "germane" are not connected to the name for the country, but come from the Latin germanus, "siblings with the same parents or father", which has cognates in Catalan, germà, and Spanish, hermano, meaning "brother".

Names from Alemanni

The name Allemagne and the other similar-sounding names above are derived from the southern Germanic Alemanni, a Suebic tribe or confederation in today's Alsace, parts of Baden-Württemberg and Switzerland.

In English, the name "Almain" or "Alman" was used for Germany and for the adjective German until the 16th century, with "German" first attested in 1520, used at first as an alternative then becoming a replacement, maybe inspired mainly by the need to differ them from the more and more independently acting Dutch. In Othello ii,3, (about 1603), for example, Shakespeare uses both "German" and "Almain" when Iago describes the drinking prowess of the English:I learned it in England, where, indeed, they are most potent in potting: your Dane, your German, and your swag-bellied Hollander—Drink, ho!—are nothing to your English.  [...] Why, he drinks you, with facility, your Dane dead drunk; he sweats not to overthrow your Almain; he gives your Hollander a vomit, ere the next pottle can be filled.Andrew Boorde also mentions Germany in his  Introduction to Knowledge, c. 1547:The people of High Almain, they be rude and rusticall, and very boisterous in their speech, and humbly in their apparel .... they do feed grossly, and they will eat maggots as fast as we will eat comfits.Through this name, the English language has also been given the Allemande (a dance), the Almain rivet and probably the almond furnace, which is probably not really connected to the word "almond" (of Greek origin) but is a corruption of "Almain furnace". In modern German, Alemannisch (Alemannic German) is a group of dialects of the Upper German branch of the Germanic language family, spoken by approximately ten million people in six countries.

Among the indigenous peoples of North America of former French and British colonial areas, the word for "Germany" came primarily as a borrowing from either French or English. For example, in the Anishinaabe languages, three terms for "Germany" exist: ᐋᓂᒫ (Aanimaa, originally Aalimaanh, from the French Allemagne), ᑌᐦᒋᒪᓐ (Dechiman, from the English Dutchman) and ᒣᐦᔭᑴᑦ (Meyagwed, Ojibwe for "foreign speaker" analogous to Slavic Némcy "Mutes" and Arab (ajam) mute), of which Aanimaa is the most common of the terms to describe Germany.

Names from Saxon
The names Saksamaa and Saksa are derived from the name of the Germanic tribe of the Saxons. The word "Saxon", Proto-Germanic *sakhsan, is believed (a) to be derived from the word seax, meaning a variety of single-edged knives: a Saxon was perhaps literally a swordsman, or (b) to be derived from the word "axe", the region axed between the valleys of the Elbe and Weser.

In Finnish and Estonian the words that historically applied to ancient Saxons changed their meaning over the centuries to denote the whole country of Germany and the Germans. In some Celtic languages the word for the English nationality is derived from Saxon, e.g., the Scottish term Sassenach, the Breton terms Saoz, Saozon, the  Cornish terms Sows, Sowson and the Welsh terms Sais, Saeson. "Saxon" also led to the "-sex" ending in Wessex, Essex, Sussex, Middlesex, etc., and of course to "Anglo-Saxon".

The Transylvanian Saxons arrived to Transylvania mainly from the Rhineland, not Saxony.

Names from Nemets
The Slavic exonym nemets, nemtsy derives from Proto-Slavic němьcь, pl. němьci, 'the mutes, not able (to speak)' (from adjective němъ 'mute' and suffix -ьcь). It may never have meant 'the mutes', but rather 'those who can't speak (like us), foreigners'. Fittingly, the Slavic autonym (Proto-Slavic *Slověninъ) likely derives from slovo, meaning 'word'. According to a theory, early Slavs would call themselves the 'speaking people' or the 'keepers of the words', as opposed to their Germanic neighbors, the 'mutes' (a similar idea lies behind Greek barbaros 'barbarian' and Arab عجم (ajam), originally meaning 'mute').

At first, němьci may have been used for any non-Slav foreigners, later it was narrowed to just Germans. The plural form is used for the Germans instead of any specific country name, e.g. Niemcy in Polish and Ńymcy in Silesian dialect. In other languages, the country's name derives from the adjective němьcьska (zemja) meaning 'German (land)' (f.i. Czech Německo). Belarusian  (Niamieččyna), Bulgarian  (Nemtsiya) and Ukrainian  (Nimecchyna) are also from němьcь but with the addition of the suffix -ina.

According to another theory, Nemtsy may derive from the Rhine-based, Germanic tribe of Nemetes mentioned by Caesar and Tacitus. This etymology is dubious for phonological reasons, as nemetes could not become Slavic němьcь.

In Russian, the adjective for "German", nemetskiy (немецкий) comes from the same Slavic root while the name for the country is Germaniya (Германия). Likewise, in Bulgarian the adjective is nemski (немски) and the country is Germaniya (Германия).

Over time, the Slavic exonym was borrowed by some non-Slavic languages. The Hungarian name for Germany is Németország (from the stem Német-, lit. "Német land"). The popular Romanian name for German is neamț, used alongside the official term, german, which was borrowed from Latin.

According to the Chinese History of Yuan, the Mongol commander Uriyangkhadai took part in the invasion of Poland and of the Holy Roman Empire, described as the land of the Nie-mi-sz'.

The Arabic name for Austria النمسا an-Nimsā or an-Namsā appeared during the Crusades era, another possibility is that the term could have been known early by Arabs in Al Andalus, the reason behind calling Austria an-Nimsā, which should designate Germans is that Arabs considered Austria to be the nation of German people for a long time in the middle ages, on the other hand the Arabic name of "Germany", Germania or Allemania, took its origin from the Latin names Germania or Alemanni respectively.

Ottoman Turkish and Persian word for Austria, Nemçe (نمچه), is borrowed from the anterior Arabic name of Austria known throughout the Islamic world who considered Austria to be home of the Germans. The Austrian Empire as well was the biggest German-speaking country in the 16th to 17th centuries bordering on the Ottoman Empire.

 Names from Baltic regions 
In Latvian and Lithuanian the names Vācija and Vokietija contain the root vāca or vākiā. Lithuanian linguist Kazimieras Būga associated this with a reference to a Swedish tribe named Vagoths in a 6th-century chronicle (cf. finn. Vuojola and eston. Oju-/Ojamaa, 'Gotland', both thought to be derived from the Baltic word; the ethnonym *vakja, used by the Votes (vadja) and the Sami, in older sources (vuowjos), may also be related). So the word for German possibly comes from a name originally given by West Baltic tribes to the Vikings. Latvian linguist Konstantīns Karulis proposes that the word may be based on the Indo-European word *wek ("speak"), from which derive Old Prussian wackis ("war cry") or Latvian vēkšķis. Such names could have been used to describe neighbouring people whose language was incomprehensible to Baltic peoples.

 Names in East Asia 
In East Asia, the names have generally been imported directly from German "deutsch" or Dutch "duits" in various ways.

The Chinese name is a phonetic approximation of the German proper adjective. The Vietnamese name is based on the Chinese name. The Japanese name is a phonetic approximation of the Dutch proper adjective. The Korean name is based on the Japanese name. This is explained in detail below:

The common Chinese name 德国 (德國) is a combination of the short form of 德意志, which approximates the German pronunciation  of Deutsch ‘German’, plus  guó ‘country’.

The Vietnamese name Đức is the Sino-Vietnamese pronunciation (đức ) of the character  that appears in the Chinese name.

Japanese language  (doitsu) is an approximation of the word  meaning ‘German’. It was earlier written with the Sino-Japanese character compound  (whose  has since been simplified to ), but has been largely superseded by the aforementioned katakana spelling .

The (South) Korean name Dogil is the Korean pronunciation of the former Japanese name. The compound coined by the Japanese was adapted into Korean, so its characters 獨逸 are not pronounced do+itsu as in Japanese, but dok+il = Dogil. Until the 1980s, South Korean primary textbooks adopted Doichillanteu which approximates the German pronunciation  of Deutschland.

The official North Korean name toich'willandŭ approximates the German pronunciation  of Deutschland. Traditionally Dogil had been used in North Korea until the 1990s. Use of the Chinese name (in its Korean pronunciation Deokguk) is attested for the early 20th century. It is now uncommon.

Etymological history
The terminology for "Germany", the "German states" and "Germans" is complicated by the unusual history of Germany over the last 2000 years. This can cause confusion in German and English, as well in other languages. While the notion of Germans and Germany is older, it is only since 1871 that there has been a nation-state of Germany. Later political disagreements and the partition of Germany (1945–1990) have further made it difficult to use proper terminology.

Starting with Charlemagne, the territory of modern Germany was within the realm of the Holy Roman Empire. It was a union of relatively independent rulers who each ruled their own territories. This empire was called in German Heiliges Römisches Reich, with the addition from the late Middle Ages of Deutscher Nation (of (the) German nation), showing that the former idea of a universal realm had given way to a concentration on the German territories.

In 19th- and 20th-century historiography, the Holy Roman Empire was often referred to as Deutsches Reich, creating a link to the later nation state of 1871. Besides the official Heiliges Römisches Reich Deutscher Nation, common expressions are Altes Reich (the old Reich) and Römisch-Deutsches Kaiserreich (Roman-German Imperial Realm).

 Pre-modern Germany (pre-1800) 

Roman authors mentioned a number of tribes they called Germani—the tribes did not themselves use the term. After 1500 these tribes were identified by linguists as belonging to a group of Germanic language speakers (which include modern languages like German, English and Dutch). Germani (for the people) and Germania (for the area where they lived) became the common Latin words for Germans and Germany.

Germans call themselves Deutsche (living in Deutschland). Deutsch is an adjective (Proto-Germanic *theudisk-) derived from Old High German thiota, diota (Proto-Germanic *theudō) meaning "people", "nation", "folk". The word *theudō is cognate with Proto-Celtic *teutā, whence the Celtic tribal name Teuton, later anachronistically applied to the Germans. The term was first used to designate the popular language as opposed to the language used by the religious and secular rulers who used Latin.

In the Late Medieval and Early Modern period, Germany and Germans were known as Almany and Almains in English, via Old French alemaigne, alemans derived from the name of the Alamanni and Alemannia. These English terms were obsolete by the 19th century. At the time, the territory of modern Germany belonged to the realm of the Holy Roman Empire (the Roman Empire restored by the Christian king of Francony, Charlemagne). This feudal state became a union of relatively independent rulers who developed their own territories. Modernisation took place on the territorial level (such as Austria, Prussia, Saxony or Bremen), not on the level of the Empire.

 1800–1871 

The French emperor, Napoleon, forced the Emperor of Austria to step down as Holy Roman Emperor in 1806. Some of the German countries were then collected into the Confederation of the Rhine, which remained a military alliance under the "protection" of Napoleon, rather than consolidating into an actual confederation. After the fall of Napoleon in 1815, these states created a German Confederation. Some member states, such as Prussia and Austria, had only a part of their territories included within the confederation, while other member states brought territories to the alliance that included people, like Poles and the Czechs, who did not speak German as their native tongue. In addition, there were also substantial German speaking populations that remained outside the confederation.

In 1841 Hoffmann von Fallersleben wrote the song Das Lied der Deutschen, giving voice to the dreams of a unified Germany (Deutschland über Alles) to replace the alliance of independent states. In this era of emerging national movements, "Germany" was used only as a reference to a particular geographical area.

In 1866/1867 Prussia and her allies left the German Confederation. After Austria was defeated in the German War of summer 1866, it acknowledged the dissolution of the confederation. Prussia was free to create a new alliance, called the North German Confederation. It became a federal state with its constitution of 1 July 1867. The remaining South German countries, with the exception of Austria and Liechtenstein, joined the country in 1870.

German Federation

The first nation state named "Germany" began in 1871; before that Germany referred to a geographical entity comprising many states, much as "the Balkans" is used today, or the term "America" was used by the founders of "the United States of America".
In German constitutional history, the expressions Reich (reign, realm, empire) and Bund (federation, confederation) are somewhat interchangeable. Sometimes they even co-existed in the same constitution: for example in the German Empire (1871–1918) the parliament had the name Reichstag, the council of the representatives of the German states Bundesrat. When in 1870–71 the North German Confederation was transformed into the German Empire, the preamble said that the participating monarchs are creating einen ewigen Bund (an eternal confederation) which will have the name Deutsches Reich.

Due to the history of Germany, the principle of federalism is strong. Only the state of Hitler (1933–1945) and the state of the communists (East Germany, 1949–1990) were centralist states. As a result, the words Reich and Bund were used more frequently than in other countries, to distinguish between imperial or federal institutions and those at a subnational level. For example, a modern federal German minister is called Bundesminister, in contrast to a Landesminister who holds office in a state such as Rhineland-Palatinate or Lower Saxony.

As a result of the Hitler regime, and maybe also of Imperial Germany up to 1919, many Germans – especially those on the political left – have negative feelings about the word Reich.Bund is another word also used in contexts other than politics. Many associations in Germany are federations or have a federalised structure and differentiate between a Bundesebene (federal/national level) and a Landesebene (level of the regional states), in a similar way to the political bodies. An example is the German Football Association Deutscher Fußballbund. (The word Bundestrainer, referring to the national football coach, does not refer to the Federal Republic, but to the Fußballbund itself.)

In other German speaking countries, the words Reich (Austria before 1918) and Bund (Austria since 1918, Switzerland) are used too. An organ named Bundesrat exists in all three of them: in Switzerland it is the government and in Germany and Austria the house of regional representatives.

Greater Germany and "Großdeutsches Reich"
In the 19th century before 1871, Germans, for example in the Frankfurt Parliament of 1848–49, argued about what should become of Austria. Including Austria (at least the German-speaking parts) in a future German state was referred to as the Greater German Solution, while a German state without Austria was the Smaller German Solution.

In 1919, the Weimar Constitution postulated the inclusion of Deutsch-Österreich (the German-speaking parts of Austria), but the Western Allies objected to this. It was realised only in 1938 when Germany annexed Austria (Anschluss). National Socialist propaganda proclaimed the realisation of Großdeutschland and, in 1943, the German Reich was officially renamed Großdeutsches Reich. However, these expressions became neither common nor popular.

In National Socialist propaganda, Austria was also called Ostmark. After the Anschluss, the previous territory of Germany was called Altreich (old Reich).

German Empire and Weimar Republic of Germany, 1871–1945

The official name of the German state in 1871 became Deutsches Reich, linking itself to the former Reich before 1806 and the rudimentary Reich of 1848/1849. This expression was commonly used in official papers and also on maps, while in other contexts Deutschland was more frequently used.

Those Germans living within its boundaries were called Reichsdeutsche, those outside were called Volksdeutsche (ethnic Germans). The latter expression referred mainly to the German minorities in Eastern Europe. Germans living abroad (for example in America) were and are called Auslandsdeutsche.

After the forced abdication of the Emperor in 1918, and the republic was declared, Germany was informally called the Deutsche Republik. The official name of the state remained the same. The term Weimar Republic, after the city where the National Assembly gathered, came up in the 1920s, but was not commonly used until the 1950s. It became necessary to find an appropriate term for the Germany between 1871 and 1919: Kaiserliches Deutschland (Imperial Germany) or (Deutsches) Kaiserreich.

 Nazi Germany 
After Adolf Hitler took power in 1933, the official name of the state was still the same. For a couple of years, Hitler used the expression Drittes Reich (Third Reich), which was introduced by writers in the last years of the republic. In fact, this was only a propaganda term and did not constitute a new state. Another propaganda term was Tausendjähriges Reich (Thousand years Reich). Later, Hitler renounced the term Drittes Reich (officially in June 1939), but it already had become popular among supporters and opponents and is still used in historiography (sometimes in quotation marks). It later led to the name Zweites Reich (Second Empire) being used to refer to Germany between the years 1871 and 1919. Germany under Hitler's rule is most commonly called in English Nazi Germany, Nazi being a colloquial abbreviation of Nationalsozialist.

Germany divided 1945–1990

After the defeat in World War II, Germany was occupied by the troops of Britain, France, the United States and Soviet Union. Berlin was a case of its own, as it was situated on the territory of the Soviet zone but divided into four sectors. The western sectors were later called West Berlin, the other one East Berlin. The communists tended to consider the Soviet sector of Berlin as a part of GDR; West Berlin was, according to them, an independent political unit. In the GDR Westberlin was the preferred spelling to de-emphasize the relationship to Berlin, Hauptstadt der DDR (the GDR capital).

After 1945, Deutsches Reich was still used for a couple of years (in 1947, for instance, when the Social Democrats gathered in Nuremberg they called their rally Reichsparteitag). In many contexts, the German people still called their country Germany, even after two German states were created in 1949.

 Federal Republic of Germany 

The Federal Republic of Germany, Bundesrepublik Deutschland, established in 1949, saw itself as the same state founded in 1867/71 but Reich gave place to Bund. For example, the Reichskanzler became the Bundeskanzler, reichsdeutsch became bundesdeutsch, Reichsbürger (citizen of the Reich) became Bundesbürger.

Germany as a whole was called Deutschland als Ganzes or Gesamtdeutschland, referring to Germany in the international borders of 1937 (before Hitler started to annex other countries). This resulted in all German (or pan germanique—a chauvinist concept) aspirations. In 1969 the Federal Ministry for All German Affairs was renamed the Federal Ministry for Intra-German Relations.

Until 1970, a number of expressions competed in the Federal Republic to designate the other German state (the communist German Democratic Republic). It was called Sowjetische Besatzungszone (SBZ, Soviet Zone of Occupation), Sowjetzone, Ostzone, Mitteldeutschland or Pankow (many GDR politicians lived or worked in Berlin-Pankow).

 German Democratic Republic 

In 1949, the communists, protected by the Soviet Union, established the Deutsche Demokratische Republik (DDR, German Democratic Republic, GDR). This state was not considered to be a successor of the Reich, but, nevertheless, to represent all good Germans. Rulers and inhabitants of GDR called their state simply DDR or unsere Republik (our republic). The GDR still supported the idea of a German nation and the need for reunification. The Federal Republic was often called Westdeutschland or the BRD. After 1970 the GDR called itself a "socialist state of German nation". Westerners called the GDR Sowjetische Besatzungszone (SBZ, Soviet Zone of Occupation), Sowjetzone, Ostzone, Mitteldeutschland or Pankow (the GDR government was in the Pankow district of Berlin).

 Federal Republic of Germany 1990–present 

In 1990 the German Democratic Republic ceased to exist. Five new federal states ("Bundesländer") were established and joined the "Bundesrepublik Deutschland" (Federal Republic of Germany). East Berlin joined through merger with West Berlin; technically this was the sixth new federal state since West Berlin, although considered a de facto federal state, had the legal status of a military occupation zone.

The official name of the country is Federal Republic of Germany (Bundesrepublik Deutschland). The terms "Westdeutschland" and "Ostdeutschland" are still used for the western and the eastern parts of the German territory, respectively.

See also

 Various terms used for Germans
 German placename etymology
 List of country name etymologies
 Territorial evolution of Germany

Notes

References

Further reading
 Bithell, Jethro, ed. Germany: A Companion to German Studies (5th edition 1955), 578pp; essays on German literature, music, philosophy, art and, especially, history. online edition  
 Buse, Dieter K. ed. Modern Germany: An Encyclopedia of History, People, and Culture 1871–1990 (2 vol 1998)
 Clark, Christopher. Iron Kingdom: The Rise and Downfall of Prussia, 1600–1947 (2006)
 Detwiler, Donald S. Germany: A Short History (3rd ed. 1999) 341pp; Germany A Short History ; by Donald S. Detwiler;
 Fulbrook, Mary. A Concise History of Germany (2004)
 Maehl, William Harvey. Germany in Western Civilization (1979), 833pp
 Ozment, Steven. A Mighty Fortress: A New History of the German People (2005)
 Reinhardt, Kurt F. Germany: 2000 Years'' (2 vols., 1961), stress on cultural topics

External links

 Why are there so many names for Germany, AKA Deutschland, Allemagne, etc.?

Germany, names for
History of Germany
Geography of Germany
German culture
Germany